Lene Pedersen (born 22 April 1972) is a Danish rower. She competed in the women's quadruple sculls event at the 1992 Summer Olympics.

References

1972 births
Living people
Danish female rowers
Olympic rowers of Denmark
Rowers at the 1992 Summer Olympics
Place of birth missing (living people)